Mutterstadt is a municipality in the Rhein-Pfalz-Kreis, in Rhineland-Palatinate, Germany. Though classified as rural the municipality does contain urbanized areas.

It is situated approximately 7 km southwest of the city center of Ludwigshafen.

History
Mutterstadt was first mentioned in the Lorsch codex in the year 767 as mutherstather marca. The name Mutterstadt is derived from the medieval personal name Muothari (or Muther) and not from the German word Mutter.

News 

On the 9th of August 2016 a suspected IS terrorist was apprehended on suspicion of planning an attack during a soccer match

References

Rhein-Pfalz-Kreis
Palatinate (region)